Leo Allan Mangum (May 24, 1896 – July 9, 1974) was a professional baseball pitcher. He played all or part of seven seasons in Major League Baseball between 1924 and 1935 with the Chicago White Sox, New York Giants, and Boston Braves. He had a record of 11–10 in his career, pitching mostly in relief.

Mangum died of a stroke on July 9, 1974.

References

External links

Major League Baseball pitchers
Boston Braves players
Chicago White Sox players
New York Giants (NL) players
Albany Senators players
Portsmouth Truckers players
Wichita Falls Spudders players
Minneapolis Millers (baseball) players
St. Joseph Saints players
Reading Keystones players
Portland Beavers players
Buffalo Bisons (minor league) players
Newark Bears (IL) players
Montreal Royals players
Syracuse Chiefs players
Jersey City Giants players
Clinton Owls players
Wilkes-Barre Barons (baseball) players
Williamsport Grays players
Baseball players from North Carolina
1896 births
1974 deaths
Sportspeople from Durham, North Carolina